Daniel Peláez Balbuena  (born 23 August 1985) is a Peruvian footballer who plays as a left back for José Gálvez FBC.

Club career
Daniel Peláez started his career with Universitario de Deportes, playing there from 2003 to 2005.

Then in 2006 he joined Unión Huaral. There he scored his first league goal of his career in Torneo Descentralizado in a 2–2 home draw against Bolognesi.

References

1985 births
Living people
Footballers from Lima
Peruvian footballers
Club Universitario de Deportes footballers
Unión Huaral footballers
Club Deportivo Universidad de San Martín de Porres players
Cienciano footballers
Alianza Atlético footballers
José Gálvez FBC footballers
Peruvian Primera División players
Association football fullbacks